Václav Glazar (9 October 1952 – 11 July 2018) was a Czech film and theater actor, playwright, screenwriter and cabaretteer.

Life 
He was born in Prague in 1952, and his first profession was dog breeding and postal delivery. In 1990, he began his career as a playwright and screenwriter.

He first showed his first work, Čestmír Kopecky, on Česká televize and then participated in the entertainment programs TV Prima.

In 2003 he wrote  Heart and Stone,  which starred Jiřina Kottová and Jaroslav Čejka. He worked here as an artistic director, an entertainer, actor and singer. He also performed in some TV and film roles.

He first appeared in front of the camera in 2002, in the movie  Rok ďábla.  Then, in his trilogy based on the known anecdotes called  Kameňák,  he cast Zdeněk Troška and directed the film  Skeletoni .

On 11 July 2018 he died of a cardiac arrest.

Filmography

Films 
Movies 
 2002 - Rok ďábla
 2003 - Kameňák
 2004 - Kameňák 2
 2005 - Kameňák 3
 2007 - Skeletoni
Television Movies 
 2005 - Vichřice mezi životem a smrtí
TV Shows
 2002 - Příběhy slavných

References 

1952 births
2018 deaths
Czech male film actors
Czech male stage actors
Male actors from Prague
Writers from Prague
20th-century Czech male actors
21st-century Czech male actors